Oslo Metro is the rapid transit system that serves Oslo and Bærum in Norway. The system is municipally owned by Sporveien and operated by the subsidiary Sporveien T-banen, which is in contract with Ruter. The metro served 85 million passengers and operated 7 million train-kilometers (4.3 train-mi) in 2013. It serves 95 stations; of which 15 are underground and 1 is built-in. In addition, 15 stations have been closed, while 4 stations on the Kolsås Line remain temporarily nonoperational since 2006 while the line is being upgraded.

The most heavily trafficked station is Jernbanetorget, which is adjacent to Oslo Central Station, closely followed by Majorstuen, the main transfer station between lines west of the city center and to several lines of the Oslo Tramway, and Nationaltheatret, which is in the heart of the city center and provides direct transfer to trains on the Drammen Line. All three stations are in the Common Tunnel. The least-used station is Lillevann, which serves the recreational area of Nordmarka.

The system is served by eight lines that operate as branches from the Common Tunnel—the shared section that runs  through the city center. The Ring Line operates in a loop north of the city center. There are six train services, numbered 1 through 6, that each operate from one branch via the city center to another branch or to the Ring Line. All services run every 15 minutes. Each branch, except for the Lambertseter Line, has one service that operates to its terminus. Because the lines gradually merge as they near the Common Tunnel, stations close to the city center may be served by multiple numbers.

The original section of the metro was the Holmenkollen Line, which opened as a suburban tramway in 1898. The Røa Line was the next to open as a branch, in 1912. The system became the first Nordic underground railway in 1928, when the underground line to Nationaltheatret was opened. The Østensjø Line opened in 1923, the Sognsvann Line in 1934, and the Kolsås Line in 1942. The opening of the upgraded metro system in the eastern boroughs occurred in 1966, after the conversion of the 1957 Lambertseter Line to metro standard. This involved the implementation of automatic train protection, longer platforms, replacement of the overhead wires with third rail and removal of level crossings. This was followed by the conversion of the Østensjø Line to metro standard, as well as the new Grorud Line and the Furuset Line. From 1987 to 1993, trains terminated at Stortinget, which has since then been the basis for the kilometer markers. In 1993, for the first time, trains ran through the city between the two networks in the Common Tunnel. The latest extension is the 2006 opening of the Ring Line, which connects the eastern and western network north of the city center. Between 2006 and 2010, the older T1000 stock was replaced with MX3000 trains.

Stations

The following table lists the name of each station; the line the station is located on; the services (1 through 6); the date the station opened, and, if applicable, closed; the average daily number of boarding passengers in 2001 and 2002 (except for stations on the Ring Line, where the figures are from 2007); the distance from Stortinget; and the grade—whether the station is underground, built-in or above ground (at-grade). Seven stations function as transfer stations between lines. Seven stations allow transfer to the Oslo Tramway, and two stations allow transfer to the national rail network. The list excludes planned stations, but includes former stations that have been closed.

Gallery

References

Bibliography

 
Oslo
Metro
Norway transport-related lists
Lists of buildings and structures in Norway